Calling All Hearts is the fourth studio album by American R&B singer Keyshia Cole, released on December 21, 2010 in the United States by Geffen Records. Appearances on the album include Nicki Minaj, Tank, Faith Evans, Timbaland and Yvonne Cole.

Background
Calling All Hearts is made of songs composed before and after Cole met her fiancé, Daniel Gibson. Cole wrote the second verse to "Last Hangover". Shortly after revealing that she was pregnant with her first child, Cole went into a short hiatus. She made her first appearance since the birth of her son at the 2010 BET Awards, performing "Airplanes" with B.o.B.  In October 2010, Cole leaked an unmastered version of her single, "I Ain't Thru" to her Twitter followers in celebration of her birthday. The single was digitally mastered and then officially released. During this time, Cole shot the video for the single as well as for the promo single "Long Way Down". Cole favorited "Tired of Doing Me".

Release and promotion
Two editions of the album were composed and released on December 21, 2010—a standard and deluxe edition. The standard edition was revealed to preview on Cole's Myspace Music page on December 16, 2010. The artwork cover shows Cole wearing blue lipstick and a red heart on her upper lip.

To promote the album, Cole made appearances on The Tonight Show with Jay Leno, The Mo'Nique Show, and The Wendy Williams Show. She also made an appearance on 106 and Park on December 20 in which she did a 30-minute special performance. Cole also opened for music act R. Kelly for the second time on his 2011 summer Love Letter Tour.

Singles
"I Ain't Thru" is the lead single from the album. An unmastered version of the single was released on October 15, 2010. After mastering, the official single was released for digital download and US radio on December 7, 2010. It peaked on the US R&B/Hip-Hop Songs at #54. The music video premiered on November 23, 2010 on 106 and Park.
"Long Way Down" was a promo single from the album. The video was shot in New York City and premiered alongside "I Ain't Thru". Although never officially sent to radio, "Long Way Down" peaked at #91 on the US R&B/Hip-Hop Songs chart.
"Take Me Away" is the second single for the album. After being chosen as the next single from fans on Twitter, Cole sent the song to US radio on February 1, 2011. She also performed the song on Conan on January 19, 2011. The song peaked on the US R&B/Hip-Hop Songs at #27. The music video premiered on April 18, 2011 on 106 and Park.

Critical reception

Calling All Hearts received mixed to positive reviews from most critics. At Metacritic, which assigns a normalized rating out of 100 to reviews from mainstream critics, the album received an average score of 66, based on 4 reviews, which indicates "generally favorable reviews." Allmusic editor Andy Kellman gave it a gave it three-and-a-half out of five stars and commented that the album "drags in spots, due in part to an absence of a "Let It Go"-type track to break up all the introspection and pain," but it is the kind of album "for those who want to hear a moody, emotional outpouring."

Jon Pareles of The New York Times viewed that the album had a standard mix of featured artists and producers, but "after an initial bit of competitive posturing [...] the songs slip into the background. Ms. Cole sings elegantly complex vocal harmonies, but the central melody lines are shapeless. Most tempos are determinedly slow." Rolling Stones Jonah Weiner gave it three-and-a-half out of five stars and wrote that "Cole is a heroine who thrives off tales of conflict, betrayal and survival. Her voice is as grit-flecked as ever, chewing through blaring beats and going pound-for-pound for ferocity [...] It's not all fisticuffs [...] but Cole is at her best when she's slugging." Steve Jones of USA Today gave the album three out of four stars and commented that "Her passionate vocals still pack a wallop, even though they are no longer fueled by angst".

Commercial performance
The album debuted at number 9 on the US Billboard 200 chart, with first-week sales of 128,000 copies. It also entered at number five on Billboard's R&B/Hip-Hop Albums and number fourteen on the Digital Albums chart. In its second week, the album dropped to number ten on the Billboard 200 selling 36,600 copies.

Track listing

Notes and sample credits
 denotes co-producer
"If I Fall in Love Again" contains samples from "Warning" by The Notorious B.I.G. "Warning" contains samples of "Walk on by" by Isaac Hayes.
"Where Would We" contains elements of "Amber Dreams" by Spyro Gyra.

Personnel
Credits for Calling All Hearts adapted from Allmusic.

 Drew Adams – assistant
 The ARE – producer
 Burt Bacharach – composer
 Matt Bang – engineer
 Jim Beanz – vocal producer
 Big Wy – producer
 Carla Carter – vocals (background)
 Ariel Chobaz – engineer
 Cary Clark – engineer
 Kahron Clement – assistant
 Deron Cole – hair stylist
 Keyshia Cole – A&R, executive producer, vocal producer
 Hal David – composer
 Reginald Dowdley – make-up
 Ron Fair – additional production, executive producer, guitar, producer, string arrangements,string conductor, vocal producer
 Ashley Fox – marketing
 Chris Galland – assistant
 Chris Godbey – engineer, mixing
 Irv Gotti – producer
 Alicia Graham – A&R
 Justin "Justa Beast" Graham – producer
 Bernie Grundman – mastering
 Manny Halley – A&R, executive producer
 Renan Harrigan – producer, keyboards
 Deshawn Hendrickson – producer, keyboards
 Tal Herzberg – engineer, pro-tools
 Ghaz Horani – assistant
 Buffy Hubelbank – A&R
 Eddie Hustle – engineer, producer
 KC Hustle – producer
 Jimmy Jam – instrumentation, producer

 Tiffany Johnson – product manager
 Sly Jordan – vocal producer
 J.U.S.T.I.C.E. League – producer
 Chris Lecky "Lucky" – engineer
 Terry Lewis – producer
 Onika Maraj – composer
 Matt Marrin – mixing
 George McWilliams – art direction, design
 Peter Mokran – mixing
 James Musshorn – assistant
 Mave (N8 Tha Maven) – producer
 David Nakaji – engineer
 Seanitta Parmer – stylist
 Dave Pensado – mixing
 Bill Pettaway – guitar
 Tresa Sanders – publicity
 Kam Sangha – producer
 Chink Santana – producer
 Allen Sides – engineer
 David Slijper – photography
 Song Dynasty – producer
 Eric Stenman – engineer
 Timbaland – producer
 Kyle Townsend – vocal producer
 Toxic – producer
 Tweek Beats – producer
 Van Nakari – assistant
 Diane Warren – composer
 Eric Weaver – assistant
 Tremaine Williams – drum programming, engineer
 Frank Wolf – engineer

Charts

Weekly charts

Year-end charts

Release history

References

2010 albums
Keyshia Cole albums
Albums produced by J.U.S.T.I.C.E. League
Albums produced by Ron Fair
Albums produced by Jimmy Jam and Terry Lewis
Albums produced by Chink Santana
Albums produced by Timbaland